Washington Union High School is a high school in the rural community of Easton in Fresno County, California. Founded in 1892 (and first accredited in 1965), Washington Union is most likely the second oldest high school in Fresno County (Fresno High School being established three years earlier in 1889). The school district encompasses roughly 90 square miles in the heart of the central San Joaquin Valley. The mascot for Washington Union is the Panthers, with school colors being purple, white, grey, and black. The school has a large and diverse population of students from the Fresno metropolitan area. 

Washington Union was one of the few schools in Fresno County that operated as a single school district until becoming unified in 2011 with two feeder schools, American Union Elementary and West Fresno Elementary. In addition to West Fresno and American Union, it is fed by four other schools in the area that operate their own elementary and middle schools. The new K-12 district serves over 2,560 students. The school boasts a variety of programs such as: Agriculture, Academic Decathlon, Health-Institute, Music, Construction, Architecture, Advancement Via Individual Determination (AVID), After School Program, Gifted and Talented Education (GATE), Link Crew, Migrant, Safe School Ambassadors and a newly created Criminal Justice Academy.

Grade academies
Washington Union is split into three academies. The Freshman Academy is located at the south end of the school. The Sophomore Academy is located at the north end of the school, just east of the Panther Academy, which serves juniors and seniors. There is also a main administration building at the north end of the school, which houses the principal and is the main point of entry for visitors. That administration office was formerly the district office before the district became unified and moved the district office to temporary buildings at West Fresno Elementary.

The Hatchet
The Hatchet is the student newspaper at Washington Union High School. Students write about anything ranging from music, entertainment, sports, school news, community news, and more. The students who write the Hatchet are very dedicated as well.

Measure W
In November 2012, voters in the Washington Unified School district were asked to vote on "Measure W." The bond passed with almost 73 percent. A 55 percent supermajority was required. Measure W is a $22 million bond measure for school improvements. The first goal for the bond is the updating of the football stadium.

MEASURE W: "To better prepare Washington Union High School students for college and quality jobs, shall Washington Unified School District upgrade technology in classrooms, job-training labs, and student- support facilities; modernize science labs; rehabilitate deteriorated roofs, plumbing, electrical, lighting, ventilation; improve safety; and acquire/construct/repair instructional and athletic sites, facilities and equipment; by issuing $22,000,000 in bonds at legal interest rates, with independent citizen oversight, no administrators' salaries, and all funds dedicated locally to Washington Union High School?"

In-progress improvements include:
 New drop-off zone for students.
 Improved access through campus.
 Replace roofs.
 Upgrade technology.
 Renovations and reconstruction to athletic facilities.

Football program
In 2011, the Washington Union Panthers won the CIF Division III state championship, becoming the first team from the Central Section to win a Championship in the six-year history of the Bowl State Championships. Under the coaching of Jeff Freitas, the Washington Union Panthers beat Campolindo by a score of 21–16. Freitas stepped away from the head coaching job after the season, taking the athletic director position for the school. Washington Union went 119-50 (.704) with one losing season in his 14 years at the school, including additional section titles in 1999 and 2010.

Baseball program
The Washington Union baseball program has won a total of six Central Section Divisional Championships.

The most recent came in 2010 by defeating Kerman 8–7. They also won the Division IV state championship, the school's first, and section title in 2009 by defeating Selma 2–1. The program became a powerhouse as they put up a record of 109-25 from 2007 to 2010 under Coach Mike Curran.  Curran led the Panthers to the 2010 Division IV State Championship, two Section Championships, four Chowchilla Tournament Championships, and one Fowler Easter Classic Championships. After Washington Union, he went on to be an assistant coach at Fresno State (2010–11), head coach at West Hills College (2011–13), and head coach at Ohlone College (2014–present).

MLB pitcher Matt Garza graduated from Washington Union.

Other sports
Washington Union is also home to Decovan Sconiers a 2003-2004 Male athlete of the year recipient. In 2004 Decovan Sconiers helped bring home Washington Union 10th Sierra Sequoia Valley Championship in Wrestling. Decovan Sconiers also captured the GrandMaster Central Valley Championship for the Heavy Weight division. With this victory it opened doors for future small school wrestlers to become Central Valley and California State Champions.

Current administration
 Randy Morris, Superintendent 
 John Sherron, Principal
 Ryan Stockton, Deputy Principal

Notable alumni
Milwaukee Brewers starting pitcher Matt Garza graduated from Washington Union and played his college baseball at Fresno State. In his tenure with the Tampa Bay Rays, Garza was the 2008 ALCS MVP and threw the franchise's first no-hitter in 2010.
Tsuyako Kitashima,  Japanese-American activist known for her work in getting reparations for Japanese American internment
1976 Olympic track and field gold medalist Maxie Parks also graduated from Washington Union.
NBA guard DeShawn Stevenson is also a Washington Union alumnus and was drafted directly out of high school in 2000 by the Utah Jazz. He also played for Orlando Magic, Washington Wizards, Dallas Mavericks, New Jersey Nets, and Atlanta Hawks over the course of his 13-year NBA career. He won a championship with the Mavericks in the 2010-11 NBA season.
MLB pitcher Dennis Springer

References

http://www.pantherslive.net/pages/Washington_Union_High_School
http://www.wusd.ws/pages/Washington_Unified_School_Dist
http://www.fresnobee.com/2012/01/13/2681952/coach-of-the-year-jeff-freitas.html

External links
Washington Union High School

High schools in Fresno County, California
Public high schools in California
1892 establishments in California